Saint John Harbour is a provincial electoral district for the Legislative Assembly of New Brunswick, Canada.  It was represented from its creation for the 1995 election until October 13, 2005 by Elizabeth Weir, the leader of the New Democratic Party of New Brunswick from 1988 to September 25, 2005. Liberal Ed Doherty had then taken the spot by winning a by-election on November 14, 2005 and was re-elected in the 2006 general election.

It is currently represented by PC Arlene Dunn who was first elected in the 2020 general election.

Prior to the New Brunswick electoral redistribution of 1994, the district had moderately different boundaries. In that year it was split in two, with part being merged with Saint John South to form this current Saint John Harbour district, while the other half of the former Harbour district became a part of Saint John Lancaster.

The riding name refers to Saint John Harbour, which the district contains.

Redistribution changes 

This district was created in the early 1990s using all of the district of Saint John South and a small portion of the old Saint John Harbour district, resulting in some confusion as most of what had been known as Saint John Harbour became a part of Saint John Portland.

In the 2006 redistribution it underwent only minor changes.

Members of the Legislative Assembly

Election results

2020 election

2018 election

2014 election

2010 election

2006 election 
Liberal Ed Doherty faced NDP candidate Dan Robichaud, whom he had run against in the 2005 by-election, as well as Conservative candidate Idee Inyangudor, an aide to a member of the cabinet and David Raymond Amos.

2005 by-election 
Elizabeth Weir, who had held this riding since its creation, resigned on October 13, 2005 and Premier of New Brunswick Bernard Lord called a by-election for the riding on October 15.  The by-election was held on November 14, 2005 and was from the outset thought to be a close race between Lord's Progressive Conservatives and the Liberals with Weir's New Democrats unlikely to be able to compete without her personal popularity, particularly against the large organizations the other parties were likely to bring into the riding from around the province.

In the end the Liberals won the race in a landslide, more than doubling their vote over the previous election, with an absolute majority of 55% in a race with four candidates.  Bernard Lord placed his reputation on the line, according to pundits, due to his choice of a high-profile candidate and his announcing over $50 million in spending over the course of the four-week campaign.  As a result, many viewed this election as a huge blow to Lord's leadership and that it, along with two years of opinion polling showing Lord's PCs trailing the Liberals, the beginning of the end of his government.

The by-election also had immediate province-wide repercussions, bringing the standings in the legislature to 27 government, 27 opposition and the speaker.  These standings would mean that the absence of one government member - even if he or she did not vote with the opposition - could defeat the government.

Timeline
October 13, 2005 - Elizabeth Weir resigns from the seat to accept the post of President and CEO of the new Energy Efficiency and Conservation Agency.
October 14, 2005 - Michelle Hooton announces she will be a candidate for the Progressive Conservatives in the by-election.
October 15, 2005 - The Liberals and the Progressive Conservatives both hold their conventions, which were previously scheduled.  Bernard Lord, the premier and leader of the PCs, drops the writ at his convention.
October 17, 2005 - Hooton is acclaimed as PC candidate.
October 18, 2005 - Dr. Ed Doherty is acclaimed as Liberal candidate.
October 20, 2005:
Glen Jardine files papers to run as an independent.
Dan Robichaud is elected as New Democratic Party candidate in a three-way race, though only 19 people voted at his nominating meeting.
October 21, 2005 - The Liberals announce their platform for the by-election, promising to invest $50 million in and around the riding if they win the next general election.  The Liberals highlight that the majority of this money would come from federal funding which is available but Lord has refused to accept based on the conditions attached thereto.  They argue that Lord is putting politics ahead of people.
November 1, 2005 - An all candidates debate is co-hosted by Rogers Cable and the New Brunswick Telegraph-Journal newspaper, Independent Glen Jardine does not participate due to his late announcement as a candidate.  The debate is televised twice, once on each of the two following days.
November 8, 2005 - An all candidates debate is held live on popular radio talk show Talk of the Town on CFBC.  All four candidates participate.
November 9, 2005 - Michelle Hooton unveils her platform.  Unlike the Liberal candidate, she does this individually.  Where the Liberals promised what they would do with Doherty as a part of their team, Hooton promised what she would try to change from within the government if she was elected.  She promised to change the government's position on nursing home payments, powers of municipalities in dealing with slum landlords, harbour cleanup, the St. Joseph's Hospital and affordable housing caps.  She also pledged to build a new justice complex, a skateboard park, several community police stations and focus on waterfront development.
November 11, 2005 - A Telegraph Journal / Corporate Research Associates poll reveals a runaway lead for Doherty.  The poll shows Doherty at 31%, Hooton at 10%, Robichaud at 9% and Jardine at 1% with 34% undecided.  Undecided voters were asked if they were leaning toward any candidate and, with leaning voters factored in, the result was Doherty 53%, Hooton 20%, Robichaud 19% and Jardine 2%.
November 14, 2005 - Ed Doherty wins the election in a landslide.  He takes the stage to read his victory speech at 9:05 local time (1 hour, 5 minutes after the polls have closed) to announce Michelle Hooton has conceded to him.  As of his announcement, he is ahead of Hooton by more than a 2 to 1 margin.

Results

Earlier results (1995-2003) 

* This was a new riding created out of a merger of the whole of the electoral district of Saint John South and a part of the former district of Saint John Harbour.  Weir was the incumbent from Saint John South.

References

External links
Website of the Legislative Assembly of New Brunswick
2005 By-election announcement
2005 By-election page at the site of the Chief Electoral Officer

New Brunswick provincial electoral districts
Politics of Saint John, New Brunswick